This page indexes the individual year in rugby union pages. Each year is annotated with one or more significant events as a reference point.

Years in rugby union

19th century

20th century
2000

21st century
2001
2002
2003 — England win the World Cup
2004
2005
2006
2007 — South Africa win the World Cup
2008
2009
2010
2011 — New Zealand win the World Cup
2012
2013
2014
2015 — New Zealand win the World Cup
2016
2017
2018
2019

See also 
History of rugby union

References 

rugby union
History of rugby union